Michael Goodfellow OBE (born 8 January 1941) is a British professor in microbial systematics, specialising in Actinomycetota taxonomy. He earlier served as head of the School of Biology in University of Newcastle upon Tyne. He is also the chair of the Bergey's Manual Trust.

Education
Goodfellow was born in Ecclefechan, Scotland and went to school at Carlisle Grammar School. He did both his undergraduate and postgraduate degrees at the University of Liverpool, graduating with PhD in 1966. He took a postdoctoral fellowship at Penn State, then as an MRC Junior Research Fellow at the University of Leicester. In 1969 he joined the then newly established University of Newcastle, where he currently serves as head of the School of Biology.

Goodfellow in Newcastle University
In Newcastle he established and developed courses in microbial systematics and biotechnology and managed the Microbial Resource Laboratory (MRC) for over 30 years. The MRC has and remains focussed on the development and application of state-of-the-art procedures designed to advance the systematics, ecology and commercialisation of actinobacteria.

Key achievements at the University of Newcastle include

Forty years research funding from sponsors such as the European Commission, Research Councils (BBSRC, ESRC, MRC and NERC), The British Council and industrial concerns, notably Glaxo Smith Kline, Novartis and Severn Trent Water (51 funded projects in total).
Supervision of students who completed 62 PhDs., 4 M.Phils, and innumerable M.Sc's.
International recognition for promoting actinobacterial biology and prokaryotic systematics, as exemplified by the award of international prizes, honorary degrees, and invitations to present keynote lectures at international symposia.

Owing to his contribution to microbial systematics, a bacterial genus of Actinomycetota was named after him as Goodfellowia.

Educationist
Apart from his research activities he was involved in development of education in Newcastle-upon-Tyne. He was appointed as a governor for Gosforth High School in 1974 and later elected the chair of governors in 1979, a post he still holds.  For his service in education he was named Member of the Order of the British Empire (MBE) in the 2010 New Year Honours list.

References

1941 births
People educated at Carlisle Grammar School
Academics of Newcastle University
Living people
Officers of the Order of the British Empire